Leslie Edwin Barratt (born 13 August 1945) is an English former professional footballer who played as an inside forward.

References

1945 births
Living people
Sportspeople from Nuneaton
English footballers
Association football inside forwards
Windermere F.C. players
Barrow A.F.C. players
Grimsby Town F.C. players
Southport F.C. players
Corby Town F.C. players
Cambridge City F.C. players
Gainsborough Trinity F.C. players
Arcadia Shepherds F.C. players
Louth United F.C. players
English Football League players